Ralph Jones (1880–1951) was an American football coach.

Ralph Jones may also refer to:

Ralph Jones (GC) (1900–1944), Australian soldier
Ralph Jones (footballer) (1876–?), Welsh footballer
Ralph Jones (racing driver) (born 1944), American stock car racing driver
Ralph Jones (musician) (1921–2000), American drummer
Ralph Waldo Emerson Jones (1905–1982), president of Grambling State University
Ralph Jones, main character in King Ralph
Tiger Jones (Ralph Jones, 1928–1994), American boxer
Ralph Jones (American football) (1921–1995), American football player

See also
Ralf Jones, video game character